Les hautes solitudes is a 1974 French experimental film written, directed and produced by Philippe Garrel. It stars Jean Seberg with Nico, Tina Aumont and Laurent Terzieff. Originally released in France in 1974, it was screened in New York's Metrograph in 2017.

References

External links

1974 films
French avant-garde and experimental films
Films directed by Philippe Garrel